Phoenix dactylifera, commonly known as date palm, is a flowering plant species in the palm family, Arecaceae, cultivated for its edible sweet fruit called dates. The species is widely cultivated across northern Africa, the Middle East, and South Asia, and is naturalized in many tropical and subtropical regions worldwide. P. dactylifera is the type species of genus Phoenix, which contains 12–19 species of wild date palms.

Slow-growing, they can reach over 100 years of age when maintained properly. Containing 61–68 percent sugar by mass when dried, dates are very sweet and are enjoyed as desserts on their own or within confections.

Dates have been cultivated in the Middle East and the Indus Valley for thousands of years. 'Intu', the Proto-Dravidian root of Hindu and India, actually refers to the plethora of date palm trees found in the Indus Valley region. There is archaeological evidence of date cultivation in Arabia from the 6th millennium BCE. Dates are “emblematic of oasis agriculture and highly symbolic in Muslim, Christian, and Jewish religions.”

Description 

Slow-growing, they can reach over 100 years of age when maintained properly. The roots have pneumatodes.

The date palm is dioecious, having separate male and female plants. They can be easily grown from seed, but only 50% of seedlings will be female and hence fruit-bearing, and dates from seedling plants are often smaller and of poorer quality. Most commercial plantations thus use cuttings of heavily cropping cultivars. Plants grown from cuttings will fruit 2–3 years earlier than seedling plants.

Dates are naturally wind-pollinated, but in traditional oasis horticulture and modern commercial orchards they are entirely hand-pollinated. Natural pollination occurs with about an equal number of male and female plants. With assistance, one male can pollinate up to 100 females. Since the males are of value only as pollinators, they are usually pruned in favor of fruit-producing female plants. Some growers do not even maintain any male plants, as male flowers become available at local markets at pollination time. Manual pollination is done by skilled labourers on ladders, or by use of a wind machine. In some areas such as Iraq the pollinator climbs the tree using a special climbing tool that wraps around the tree trunk and the climber's back (called  in Arabic) to keep him attached to the trunk while climbing.

Three main cultivar groups exist: soft (e.g. 'Barhee', 'Halawy', 'Khadrawy', 'Medjool'); semi-dry (e.g. 'Dayri', 'Deglet Nour', 'Zahdi'), and dry (e.g. 'Thoory').

Genome 

In 2009, a team of researchers at the Weill Cornell Medical College in Qatar published a draft version of the date palm genome (Khalas variety). The draft genome sequence was improved in 2019 with the release of a more complete genome sequence using small molecule real-time sequencing technology by a team from the New York University Abu Dhabi Center for Genomics and Systems Biology and the UAE University Khalifa Center for Genetic Engineering and Biotechnology in the United Arab Emirates. With the release of this improved genome assembly, the UAE researchers were able to map genes for fruit color and sugar content. The NYU Abu Dhabi researchers had also re-sequenced the genomes of several date varieties to develop the first single nucleotide polymorphism map of the date palm genome in 2015.

Al-Dous et al., 2011 and Al-Mssallem et al., 2013 provide two genomes for P. dactylifera.

Etymology 
The species name dactylifera 'date-bearing' is Latin, and is formed with the loanword  in Latin from Greek , which means 'date' (also 'finger'), and with the native Latin , which means 'to bear'. The fruit is known as a date. The fruit's English name (through Old French, through Latin) comes from the Greek word for 'finger', because of the fruit's elongated shape.

Distribution 
The place of origin of the date palm is uncertain because of long cultivation. According to some sources it probably originated from the Fertile Crescent region straddling Egypt and Mesopotamia while others state that they are native to the Persian Gulf area or even western India. Fossil records show that the date palm has existed for at least 50 million years.

Ecology 

A major palm pest, the red palm beetle (Rhynchophorus ferrugineus), currently poses a significant threat to date production in parts of the Middle East as well as to iconic landscape specimens throughout the Mediterranean world. Pinhas et al. 2008 uses piezoelectric sensors and speech recognition technology to detect R. ferrugineus. They achieved a 98% detection ratio on young P. dactylifera in very controlled laboratory conditions. Another significant insect pest is Ommatissus lybicus, sometimes called the "dubas bug", whose sap sucking results in sooty mould formation.

In the 1920s, eleven healthy Medjool palms were transferred from Morocco to the United States where they were tended by members of the Chemehuevi tribe in a remote region of Nevada. Nine of these survived and in 1935, cultivars were transferred to the "U.S. Date Garden" in Indio, California. Eventually this stock was reintroduced to Africa and led to the U.S. production of dates in Yuma, Arizona, and Bard, California.

As an invasive species 
Not all cities and countries have benefited from the date palm's resilience and ease of growth. It has made the invasive species list in some parts of the United States, Canada and Australia but these references are to the related but inedible Canary Island date palm (Phoenix canariensis).

Cultivation 

Dates are a traditional crop throughout the Middle East and north Africa. Dates (especially Medjool and Deglet Nour) are also cultivated in the southwestern United States, and in Sonora and Baja California in Mexico.

Date palms can take 4 to 8 years after planting before they will bear fruit, and start producing viable yields for commercial harvest between 7 and 10 years. Mature date palms can produce  of dates per harvest season. They do not all ripen at the same time so several harvests are required. To obtain fruit of marketable quality, the bunches of dates must be thinned and bagged or covered before ripening so that the remaining fruits grow larger and are protected from weather and animals, such as birds, that also like to eat them.

Date palms require well-drained deep sandy loam soils with a pH of 8–11 (alkaline). The soil should have the ability to hold moisture and also be free of calcium carbonate.

Dates have been cultivated in the Middle East and the Indus Valley for thousands of years, and there is archaeological evidence of date cultivation in Mehrgarh, a Neolithic civilization in western Pakistan, around 7000 BCE and in eastern Arabia between 5530 and 5320 calBC. Dates have been cultivated since ancient times from Mesopotamia to prehistoric Egypt. The ancient Egyptians used the fruits to make date wine and ate dates at harvest. Evidence of cultivation is continually found throughout later civilizations in the Indus Valley, including the Harappan period from 2600 to 1900 BCE.

One cultivar, the Judean date palm, is renowned for its long-lived orthodox seed, which successfully sprouted after accidental storage for 2,000 years. In total seven seeds about 2000 years old have sprouted and turned into trees named Methuselah, Hannah, Adam, Judith, Boaz, Jonah and Uriel. The upper survival time limit of properly stored seeds remains unknown. A genomic study from New York University Abu Dhabi Center for Genomics and Systems Biology showed that domesticated date palm varieties from North Africa, including well-known varieties such as Medjool and Deglet Nour, are a hybrid between Middle East date palms and the Cretan wild palm, P. theophrasti. Date palms appear in the archaeological record in North Africa about 2,800 years ago, suggesting that the hybrid was spread by the Minoans or Phoenicians.

An article on date palm tree cultivation is contained in Ibn al-'Awwam's 12th-century agricultural work, Book on Agriculture.

Production 
In 2020, world production of dates was 9 million tonnes, led by Egypt, Saudi Arabia, Iran, and Algeria with 60% of the world total combined (table).

Cultivars 

A large number of date cultivars and varieties emerged through history of its cultivation, but the exact number is difficult to assess. Hussain and El-Zeid (1975) have reported 400 varieties, while Nixon (1954) named around 250. Most of those are limited to a particular region, and only a few dozen have attained broader commercial importance. The most renowned cultivars worldwide include Deglet Noor, originally of Algeria; Yahidi and Hallawi of Iraq; Medjool of Morocco; Mazafati of Iran.

Uses

Fruits 

Dry or soft dates are eaten out-of-hand, or may be pitted and stuffed with fillings such as almonds, walnuts, pecans, candied orange and lemon peel, tahini, marzipan or cream cheese. Pitted dates are also referred to as stoned dates. Partially dried pitted dates may be glazed with glucose syrup for use as a snack food. Dates can also be chopped and used in a range of sweet and savory dishes, from tajines (tagines) in Morocco to puddings, ka'ak (types of Arab cookies) and other dessert items. Date nut bread, a type of cake, is very popular in the United States, especially around holidays. Dates are also processed into cubes, paste called 'ajwa, spread, date syrup or "honey" called "dibs" or rub in Libya, powder (date sugar), vinegar or alcohol. Vinegar made from dates was a traditional product of the Middle East. Recent innovations include chocolate-covered dates and products such as sparkling date juice, used in some Islamic countries as a non-alcoholic version of champagne, for special occasions and religious times such as Ramadan. When Muslims break fast in the evening meal of Ramadan, it is traditional to eat a date first.

Reflecting the maritime trading heritage of Britain, imported chopped dates are added to, or form the main basis of a variety of traditional dessert recipes including sticky toffee pudding, Christmas pudding and date and walnut loaf. They are particularly available to eat whole at Christmas time. Dates are one of the ingredients of HP Sauce, a popular British condiment.

In Southeast Spain (where a large date plantation exists including UNESCO-protected Palmeral of Elche) dates (usually pitted with fried almond) are served wrapped in bacon and shallow-fried. In Israel date syrup, termed silan, is used while cooking chicken and also for sweets and desserts, and as a honey substitute. Dates are one of the ingredients of jallab, a Middle Eastern fruit syrup. In Pakistan, a viscous, thick syrup made from the ripe fruits is used as a coating for leather bags and pipes to prevent leaking.

Nutrition 
On average, dates contain 21% water, 75% carbohydrates (63% sugars and 8% dietary fiber), 2% protein, and less than 1% fat (table). In a  reference amount, dates supply  of food energy and are a moderate source (10-19% of the Daily Value) of pantothenic acid, vitamin B6, and the dietary minerals magnesium, manganese, and potassium, with other micronutrients in low amounts (table).

Glucose makes up about 55% of sugar content in dates, while fructose is about 45%, and sucrose is negligible. A 2011 study found that the glycemic index (GI) for five different varieties of date had a range of 46–55, while a 2002 report showed GI values of 31–50, results indicating dates are a relatively low GI food source. Like many other fruits, dates contain measurable levels of calcium oxalates.

Forks 
In the past, sticky dates were served using specialized small forks having two metal tines, called daddelgaffel in Scandinavia. Some designs were patented. These have generally been replaced by an inexpensive pale-colored knobbled plastic fork that resembles a date branch, which is traditionally included with numerous brands of prepackaged trays of dates (example), though this practice has declined in response to increased use of resealable packaging and calls for fewer single-use plastics.

Seeds 
Date seeds are soaked and ground up for animal feed. Their oil is suitable for use in cosmetics and dermatological applications. The oil contains lauric acid (36%) and oleic acid (41%). Date palm seeds contain 0.56–5.4% lauric acid. They can also be processed chemically as a source of oxalic acid. Date seeds are also ground and used in the manner of coffee beans, or as an additive to coffee. Experimental studies have shown that feeding mice with the aqueous extract of date pits exhibit anti-genotoxic effects and reduce DNA damage induced by N-nitroso-N-methylurea.

Fruit clusters 
Stripped fruit clusters are used as brooms. Recently, the floral stalks have been found to be of ornamental value in households.

Sap 

Apart from P. dactylifera, wild date palms such as Phoenix sylvestris and Phoenix reclinata, depending on the region, can be also tapped for sap.

Leaves 
In North Africa, date palm leaves are commonly used for making huts. Mature leaves are also made into mats, screens, baskets, and fans. Processed leaves can be used for insulating board. Dried leaf petioles are a source of cellulose pulp, used for walking sticks, brooms, fishing floats, and fuel. Leaf sheaths are prized for their scent, and fibre from them is also used for rope, coarse cloth, and large hats.

Young date leaves are cooked and eaten as a vegetable, as is the terminal bud or heart, though its removal kills the palm. The finely ground seeds are mixed with flour to make bread in times of scarcity. The flowers of the date palm are also edible. Traditionally the female flowers are the most available for sale and weigh . The flower buds are used in salad or ground with dried fish to make a condiment for bread.

In culture 

In Ancient Rome, the palm fronds used in triumphal processions to symbolize victory were most likely those of P. dactylifera. The date palm was a popular garden plant in Roman peristyle gardens, though it would not bear fruit in the more temperate climate of Italy. It is recognizable in frescoes from Pompeii and elsewhere in Italy, including a garden scene from the House of the Wedding of Alexander. In later times, traders spread dates around southwest Asia, northern Africa, and Spain. Dates were introduced into California by the Spaniards by 1769, existing by then around Mission San Diego de Alcalá, and were introduced to Mexico as early as the 16th century.

Dates are mentioned more than 50 times in the Bible and 20 times in the Quran. Date palms holds great significance in Abrahamic religions. The tree was heavily cultivated as a food source in ancient Israel where Judaism and subsequently Christianity developed. Date palm leaves are used for Palm Sunday in the Christian religion.

Many Jewish scholars believe that the "honey" reference in Exodus chapter 3 to "a land flowing with milk and honey" is actually a reference to date "honey", and not honey from bees. In the Torah, palm trees are referenced as symbols of prosperity and triumph. Psalm 92:12 states that "The righteous shall flourish like the palm tree." Palm branches occurred as iconography in sculpture ornamenting the Second Jewish Temple in Jerusalem, on Jewish coins, and in the sculpture of synagogues. They are also used as ornamentation in the Feast of the Tabernacles. Date palms are one of the seven species of native Israeli plants revered in Judaism. The date palm has historically been considered a symbol of Judea and the Jewish people. The leaves are used as a lulav in the Jewish holiday of Sukkot. They are also commonly used as the s'chach in the construction of a sukkah.

In the Quran, Allah instructs Maryām (the Virgin Mary) to eat dates during labour pains when she gives birth to Isa (Jesus). In Islamic culture, dates and yogurt or milk are traditionally the first foods consumed for Iftar after the sun has set during Ramadan.

In Mandaeism, the date palm (Mandaic: , which can refer to both the tree and its fruit) symbolizes the cosmic tree and is often associated with the cosmic wellspring. The date palm, associated with masculinity, and wellspring, associated with femininity, are often mentioned together as heavenly symbols in Mandaean texts.

Gallery

References

External links 
 Date palm cultivation (Food and Agriculture Organization)
 Date palm products (additional information from the FAO)

 
Desert fruits
Drought-tolerant trees
Edible palms
Garden plants of Africa
Garden plants of Asia
Ornamental trees
dactylifera
Date palm
Trees of Africa
Tropical agriculture
Fruit trees
Plants in the Bible